Après le Déluge is a collection of outtakes from Elliott Murphy's 1970s recording sessions, first put together by EMIS (the Elliott Murphy Information Society) for fans and later released on New Rose Records in Europe.

Track listing
All tracks composed by Elliott Murphy.

"It Feels Like"
"Fan Mail"
"Madalyn"
"What's The Matter"
"Razor Love"
"Jefferson Davis Continental"
"Reflections on the Fog"
"It Feels LIke"
"Whada ya Know" 
"The Ballad of Sal Paradise"

Personnel
Elliott Murphy - vocals, guitar, harmonica, keyboards
Hargus Pig Robbins - piano, keyboards
Arthur Russell - piano, keyboards
Ralph Schuckett - piano, keyboards
Eric Troyer - piano, keyboards
Jerry Harrison - piano, keyboards
Tom Wolk - guitar
Reggie Young - guitar
Steve Cataldo - guitar
Jesse Chamberlain - drums
Howie Wyeth - drums
Mike Braun - drums
Ernie Brooks - bass
Jennifer Jacobson - vocals
Ellen Shipley - vocals
Kenny Laguna - harmonium
Andy Paley - drums

References

1987 albums
Elliott Murphy albums